Jacek Berensztajn  (born 16 October 1973 in Piotrków Trybunalski) is a retired Polish professional footballer who played for GKS Bełchatów, Odra Wodzisław Śląski and Zagłębie Sosnowiec in the Polish Ekstraklasa.

Berensztajn made two appearances for the Poland national football team.

References

 

1973 births
Living people
Sportspeople from Piotrków Trybunalski
Polish footballers
Poland international footballers
GKS Bełchatów players
Siarka Tarnobrzeg players
Odra Wodzisław Śląski players
KSZO Ostrowiec Świętokrzyski players
Zagłębie Sosnowiec players
RKS Radomsko players
SV Ried players
Expatriate footballers in Austria
Association football midfielders